The 1981 New Zealand Royal Visit Honours were appointments by Elizabeth II to the Royal Victorian Order, to mark her visit to New Zealand in October that year. The honours were announced between 15 October and 20 October 1981.

The recipients of honours are displayed here as they were styled before their new honour.

Royal Victorian Order

Knight Grand Cross (GCVO)
 Sir David Stuart Beattie  – governor-general of New Zealand

Member, fourth class (MVO)
 Lieutenant Colonel Frederick Betton Bath 
 Richard Butler 
 Superintendent Ian Lindsay Mills

In 1984, Members of the Royal Victorian Order, fourth class, were redesignated as Lieutenants of the Royal Victorian Order (LVO).

Member, fifth class (MVO)
 Flight Lieutenant John Henry Staples Hamilton – Royal New Zealand Air Force
 Raymond George Hawthorn 
 Genevieve Margaret Jordan

Royal Victorian Medal

Silver (RVM)
 Robert Harold Francis Sisson-Stretch

References

1981 awards
Royal Visit Honours
Monarchy in New Zealand